Eyshabad (also Romanized as ‘Eyshābād) is a village in Fajr Rural District, in the Central District of Yazd County, Yazd Province, Iran. At the 2006 census, its population was 5,144, in 1,326 families.

References 

Populated places in Yazd County